Balgay (Gaelic: Baile (na) Gaoithe) is a suburb in the west end of Dundee, Scotland. The name, derived from Gaelic, seems to mean  'stead of the marsh/wind' . During the 17th century, Balgay House was built and now this has become incorporated into Royal Victoria Hospital. Balgay Hill and Victoria Park were acquired by Dundee City Corporation in 1870 as public parks. The Mills Observatory designed by James MacLellan Brown was added in 1935 at the summit of the 143m hill. It is the only full-time public observatory in UK.

Lochee Park is situated east of Balgay and has a perimeter of 1½ miles (approx). The park annually hosts firework displays to celebrate Bonfire Night in conjunction with Radio Tay roadshow. Primary schools in Balgay include Hillside Primary School and Ancrum Road Primary School. Menzieshill High School was also located nearby.

Balgay is now part of the Lochee ward, and after the council elections on 3 May 2007, the Councillors are Nigel Don, Bob Duncan, (both Scottish National Party), John Letford and Tom Ferguson, (both Labour)

Many bus routes in Dundee pass through Balgay including Xplore Dundee bus services 9, 10, 11, 12, 17, 22/22c and Stagecoach Strathtay services 72, 73 and 75. Services 17, 22/22c, 72, 73 and 75 usually terminates at the Ninewells Hospital terminus.

Notes

Areas of Dundee